Charles Sherrill may refer to:
 Charles H. Sherrill (1814–1887), American politician from New York, father diplomat Charles H. Sherrill
 Charles H. Sherrill (ambassador) (1867–1936), American diplomat, son of Charles H. Sherrill
 Charles David Sherrill, American computational chemist

See also
 Sweet Charles Sherrell (born 1943), American bassist